Qol Ghali or Qul Ali (c. 1183-1236) was a famous Muslim Volga Bulgarian poet. His most famous poem is Qíssa-i Yosıf (قصه یوسف, Tale of Yusuf), written in the Old Tatar language, which is not mutually intelligible with the modern Tatar, Bashkir and Chuvash languages.

Biography 
According to historian Ravil Bukharaev, Ghali was likely born into a cleric family in Volga Bulgaria. He studied in the Khwarezmean madrassah. Ghali also resided or studied at various areas around Volga Bulgaria and possibly traveled to Iran, Syria and other parts of the Middle East. He wrote his immortal poem in 1233. It is theorized that Ghlai spent his last years at Bilyar. He was probably killed in 1236 during the Mongol invasion of Volga Bulgaria.

Qíssa-i Yosıf (قصه یوسف) was inspired by Qur'anic stories of Joseph. According to textual analysis, the poem contains may Persian and Arabic loanwords. The poem shows familiarity with Egyptian and other Middle Eastern customs but also contains detailed descriptions of the culture and customs of the inhabitants of Volga Bulgaria.

Legacy
His poems are celebrated by the Tatars, the Bashkirs and the Chuvash.

Qíssa-i Yosıf (قصه یوسف) was inspired by Qur'anic stories of Joseph. The poem is devoted to the struggle against evil and for human happiness. The poem played a major role in the Muslim Volga Bulgarian culture and later the Bashkir and Tatar culture. More than 200 manuscripts have been found among the Bashkirs and Tatars. The poem was prepared for publishing for the first time by the poet Utız İmäni and printed in 1839 by Räxmätulla Ämirxanov. Since then it has been republished 80 times.

The poem was often used as a textbook to teach or improve the reading skills of children and adults for centuries. The poem greatly influenced later poets in the region.

Qol Ghali award
The Qol Ghali International Award is named after Qol Ghali. It is awarded to recognize excellence in literature and poetry. The award was established in 1992.

References

Volga Bulgaria
Tatar poets
Chuvash-language poets